Washington Exclusive was an American news and public affairs television program broadcast on the DuMont Television Network and produced by Martha Roundtree and Lawrence Spivak, who also co-produced Meet the Press.

Broadcast history
The series ran nationally from June 21 to November 1, 1953, and was hosted by Frank McNaughton. The show aired Sunday nights at 7:30 pm ET. Six former U.S. senators appeared on the panel, discussing current issues. The series was cancelled in November 1953.

This series is not to be confused with the similarly named Washington Report, another DuMont public-affairs program from Washington which aired from May to August 1951.

Episode status
As with most DuMont series, no episodes are known to exist.

See also
List of programs broadcast by the DuMont Television Network
List of surviving DuMont Television Network broadcasts

References

Bibliography
David Weinstein, The Forgotten Network: DuMont and the Birth of American Television (Philadelphia: Temple University Press, 2004) 
Alex McNeil, Total Television, Fourth edition (New York: Penguin Books, 1980) 
Tim Brooks and Earle Marsh, The Complete Directory to Prime Time Network TV Shows, Third edition (New York: Ballantine Books, 1964)

External links

DuMont historical website

DuMont Television Network original programming
1953 American television series debuts
1953 American television series endings
Black-and-white American television shows
English-language television shows
DuMont news programming